Kaitlin Persson Hopkins (born February 1, 1964) is an American actress and singer, the daughter of actress Shirley Knight and stage producer/director Gene Persson.

Biography
Hopkins was born in New York City to actress Shirley Knight and actor producer Gene Persson. After her parents' divorce, Hopkins was raised in London by her mother and stepfather, John Hopkins, and returned to New York in 1976, at the age of 12. The following year she began her career in a summer stock production of The Children's Hour starring her mother and Joanne Woodward.

In 1982, at the age of 18, Hopkins graduated from the Williston Northampton School, where she was a member of the Williston Widigers.

Hopkins attended the musical theater program at Carnegie Mellon University and studied acting at the Royal Academy of Dramatic Arts in London.

Hopkins' first television credit was an appearance on the soap opera One Life to Live, followed by a regular role on Another World. In 1993, she moved to Los Angeles, where she joined The Matrix Theatre Company. She spent weekends singing at The Pink in Santa Monica, and later performed at The Cinegrill, The Gardina, and At My Place. During this period, her television credits included Beverly Hills, 90210, Murder, She Wrote, The Practice, Diagnosis: Murder, Star Trek: Deep Space Nine, Star Trek: Voyager, Spin City, and Dr. Quinn, Medicine Woman.

In 1994, at the age of 30, Hopkins was cast in the rock opera I Was Looking at the Ceiling and Then I Saw the Sky by Peter Sellars. She spent the next year traveling the world with the production, performing in Paris, Hamburg, Helsinki, and Montreal, as well as at the Edinburgh Festival, among other locales.

In 2002, aged 38, Hopkins made her Broadway debut in Noises Off. She has also appeared in the Lincoln Center benefit performance of Anything Goes with Patti LuPone and How the Grinch Stole Christmas.

Hopkins has performed in numerous live radio plays for LA Theater Works, including Proof with Anne Heche and The Heidi Chronicles with Martha Plimpton.

In 2009, Hopkins was named the new Head of Musical Theatre at Texas State University under the Department Chair, Dr. John Fleming. Her husband, Jim Price, is also on the faculty at Texas State, where he is the Head of Playwriting.

Discography 
 Make Me Sweat (2004)

Acting credits

Theatre
Bare: A Pop Opera
The Great American Trailer Park Musical
Bat Boy: The Musical
Come Back, Little Sheba
Disney's On the Record
Present Laughter
The Philanderer
She Loves Me

Film and television
Confessions of a Shopaholic
The Nanny Diaries
How to Kill Your Neighbor's Dog
Crocodile Dundee in Los Angeles
“Diagnosis Murder“: By Reason of Insanity
Little Boy Blue
As Good as It Gets
Rescue Me
Providence
Star Trek: Voyager
Star Trek: Deep Space Nine
The Division
Wings

References

External links
 Official website
 
 
 

1964 births
Actresses from New York City
American film actresses
American musical theatre actresses
American stage actresses
American television actresses
Alumni of RADA
Carnegie Mellon University College of Fine Arts alumni
Texas State University faculty
Living people